Marzena Dorota Wróbel (born 15 October 1963, in Radom) is a Polish politician. She was elected to the Sejm on 25 September 2005, getting 7,524 votes in 17 Radom district as a candidate from the Law and Justice list.

See also
Members of Polish Sejm 2005-2007

External links
Marzena Wróbel - parliamentary page - includes declarations of interest, voting record, and transcripts of speeches.

1963 births
Living people
People from Radom
Members of the Polish Sejm 2005–2007
Women members of the Sejm of the Republic of Poland
Law and Justice politicians
21st-century Polish women politicians
Members of the Polish Sejm 2007–2011
Members of the Polish Sejm 2011–2015